Codorniu is a surname. Notable people with the surname include:

 Juan Hidalgo Codorniu (1927–2018), Spanish composer, poet, and artist
 Manuel Codorniu (1788–1857), Spanish physician, educator, and politician
 Xavier Codorniu (born 1946), Spanish politician